Cryptomelane is a potassium manganese oxide mineral with formula K(Mn4+,Mn2+)8O16.

In 1942 the name cryptomelane was proposed as part of an effort to sort out the manganese oxide minerals referred to as psilomelane. Cryptomelane was identified and defined based on X-ray diffraction studies of samples from Tombstone, Arizona; Deming, New Mexico; Mena, Arkansas; and Philipsburg, Montana.

Cryptomelane was approved in 1982 by the International Mineralogical Association (IMA).  The type locality is the Tombstone District, Cochise County, Arizona, US. The name comes from the Greek for hidden and black, in reference to the confusion and difficulty in recognition of the various black manganese oxide minerals referred to as psilomelane, the collective term for hard manganese oxides.

It is of rather common occurrence in oxidized manganese deposits where it occurs as replacements and open space fillings in veins and vugs. It occurs in association with pyrolusite, nsutite, braunite, chalcophanite, manganite and various other manganese oxides.

References

Manganese(II,IV) minerals
Oxide minerals
Tetragonal minerals
Minerals in space group 87